Liam James Rosenior (born 9 July 1984) is an English football manager and former player. He played either as a full-back or winger. He is the son of former player and manager Leroy Rosenior, and spent time on loan at Torquay United, where his father was manager, during their promotion season in 2003–04. He also played for Bristol City, Fulham, Reading, Ipswich Town, Hull City and Brighton & Hove Albion. On 3 November 2022, he was appointed head coach at Hull City.

Club career
Born in London, Rosenior started his career with Bristol City as a midfielder. He scored the second goal in a 2–0 victory for Bristol City against Carlisle United in the 2003 Football League Trophy Final at the Millennium Stadium. In the first round of Bristol City's cup run they defeated Queens Park Rangers on penalties, and Rosenior scored the winning penalty in the shootout. In November 2003 he signed for Fulham. He made his Premiership debut for the club on 13 December in a 1–1 home draw with Manchester United, earning the Sky Sports Man of the Match award. He scored once for Fulham, in a League Cup tie against Lincoln City on 21 September 2005.

He signed a four-year extension to his Fulham contract in July 2006, but left Fulham for Reading on 31 August 2007 for an undisclosed fee on a three-year contract, with Seol Ki-Hyeon going the other way. His debut for Reading came in a 2–1 defeat to Sunderland on 15 September 2007, and he scored his first goal for Reading in a 7–4 defeat to Portsmouth on 29 September 2007, although it was initially awarded to Stephen Hunt.

On 2 September 2009, Rosenior joined Ipswich Town on loan for the remainder of 2009–10 season. He scored his first goal for Ipswich against Barnsley on 3 October 2009.

Hull City
On 29 October 2010, Rosenior joined Hull City on a short-term agreement until 1 January 2011. He made his debut the following day in the away match at Barnsley. He signed a -year deal with Hull on 21 December 2010. Saying "I'm delighted, It's something that we kind of half agreed when I first came here, but it relied on the takeover being completed for me to stay."

2013–14 season
On 18 August 2013, Rosenior was an unused substitute as Hull lost 2–0 against Chelsea at Stamford Bridge on the opening weekend of the season. On 22 March 2014, Rosenior scored his only goal for Hull City when heading the rebound in from a Nikica Jelavić penalty that was saved by West Bromwich Albion goalkeeper Ben Foster. On 17 May 2014, he started in the 2014 FA Cup Final against Arsenal.

On 28 May 2015, Hull City released Rosenior and five other players who were out of contract at the end of the 2014–15 season.

Brighton & Hove Albion
On 23 June 2015, Rosenior signed for Brighton & Hove Albion on a three-year deal following his release from Hull City. He retired from playing on 30 July 2018.

Coaching career

Brighton & Hove Albion
Following his retirement from playing, Rosenior remained at Brighton, taking up the position of assistant coach with Brighton's under-23 team, which he combined with appearing as a pundit on Sky Sports.

Derby County
On 10 July 2019, Rosenior was appointed as specialist first team coach to Phillip Cocu at Derby County. He was appointed assistant manager of the club on 15 January 2021 following the appointment of Wayne Rooney as manager.

Following Rooney's resignation on 24 June 2022, Rosenior took over as interim manager. He was relieved of his duties as manager on 21 September 2022 while still employed by the club as Derby sought a permanent manager. Following the appointment of Paul Warne, Rosenior left the club.

Hull City
On 3 November 2022, Rosenior was appointed head coach at Hull City on a two-and-a-half year deal, returning to the club where he made 161 appearances between 2010 and 2015.

International career
Rosenior was born in England, and is of Sierra Leonean descent through his father, Leroy Rosenior, who was an international footballer for Sierra Leone. Rosenior was called up to the England U21 squad in March 2005, and made his debut in a 2–2 draw with Germany U21 on 25 March 2005, closely followed by a second cap in a 2–0 win over Azerbaijan U21 on 29 March 2005 His performances earned him a call up to the England U20 squad for the Toulon Tournament in June 2005, where he played three times and scored one goal.

However, it would be over a year and a half before he would add to his England U21 caps, with the next one coming against Netherlands U21 on 14 November 2006. Rosenior made it into the squad for the 2007 UEFA European Under-21 Championship, but only made one appearance, as a substitute in the semi final against Holland U21. He took part in the shootout in this game, scoring his penalty as England lost 13–12. Due to his age, this would prove to be his seventh and last appearance for the England U21 team.

Career statistics

Managerial statistics

References

External links

1984 births
Living people
Footballers from Wandsworth
English footballers
England youth international footballers
England under-21 international footballers
Association football defenders
Bristol City F.C. players
Fulham F.C. players
Torquay United F.C. players
Reading F.C. players
Ipswich Town F.C. players
Hull City A.F.C. players
Brighton & Hove Albion F.C. players
Premier League players
English Football League players
English sportspeople of Sierra Leonean descent
Black British sportsmen
Brighton & Hove Albion F.C. non-playing staff
English association football commentators
Derby County F.C. non-playing staff
Derby County F.C. managers
Hull City A.F.C. managers
Association football coaches
FA Cup Final players
English football managers